Camila is the Portuguese and Spanish form of the given name Camilla and may refer to:

Film and television
 Camila (TV series), a Mexican telenovela from 1998
 Camila (film), a 1984 Argentine film by María Luisa Bemberg

Music
 Camila (band), Mexican band
 Camila (album), Camila Cabello's debut studio album released 2018
 "Camila, Camila", a song by Brazilian rock band Nenhum de Nós

Other uses
 Camila (Pontus), a town of ancient Pontus, in Anatolia
 Camila Martins Pereira (born 1994), Brazilian footballer known by the mononym Camila
 Camila, brand name of a progestogen-only pill containing norethisterone (norethindrone)

See also
 Camilla (disambiguation)
 Camilla (born 1947), Queen consort of Charles III of the United Kingdom